Jang Jong-hyun (born 28 March 1984) is a South Korean field hockey player who competed in the 2004, 2008 and in the 2012 Summer Olympics.

References

External links

1984 births
Living people
South Korean male field hockey players
Olympic field hockey players of South Korea
Field hockey players at the 2004 Summer Olympics
Field hockey players at the 2008 Summer Olympics
Field hockey players at the 2012 Summer Olympics
Asian Games medalists in field hockey
Field hockey players at the 2006 Asian Games
Field hockey players at the 2010 Asian Games
Field hockey players at the 2014 Asian Games
Field hockey players at the 2018 Asian Games
Asian Games gold medalists for South Korea
Asian Games bronze medalists for South Korea
Medalists at the 2006 Asian Games
Medalists at the 2014 Asian Games
21st-century South Korean people
2006 Men's Hockey World Cup players
2010 Men's Hockey World Cup players
2014 Men's Hockey World Cup players
2023 Men's FIH Hockey World Cup players